Mislim Koçi Stadium is a multi-use stadium in Gramsh, Elbasan, Albania which is used as the home ground of local football club KF Gramshi.

References

Football venues in Albania
Buildings and structures in Gramsh, Elbasan